Thomas Michael “Tomi” Jenkins is an American vocalist, musician, composer, record producer and author, known commonly as one of the founding members and lead singers of the funk and R&B band, Cameo, who has over 17 million records sold.

Jenkins is the co-writer of many of the group's biggest hits, including, “Secrets of Time”, “Flirt”, “Single Life”, “Back and Forth", “Talkin’ Out the Side of Your Neck”, “She’s Strange”, “Candy”, and the Grammy-nominated, “Word Up”.

Career

Forming of Cameo 
In 1974, Jenkins was introduced to Larry Blackmon through Blackmon's manager and a short time later they formed the group the American soul/funk group New York City Players, with Jenkins joining Blackmon, Nathan Leftenant, keyboardist Gregory Johnson and other New York musicians. They signed with Neil Bogart’s Casablanca Records subsidiary label, Chocolate City, and changed their name to Cameo in 1976.

Chocolate City Records 
In 1980, Cameosis was released and debuted at number 1 and 25 on the US Top R&B/Hip-Hop Albums and Billboard 200. The album gained considerable momentum through singles “We’re Goin’ Out Tonight” and "Shake Your Pants".  "We’re Goin’ Out Tonight” was co-written by Jenkins and debuted at number 11 on the US Top R&B/Hip-Hop Singles.

In 1981, Cameo released their seventh and final album with Chocolate City Records, Knights of the Sound Table, which debuted at numbers 2 and 44 on both the US Top R&B/Hip-Hop Albums and Billboard 200 charts. The single "Freaky Dancin'" was co-written by Jenkins and debuted at number 3 on the US Top R&B/Hip-Hop Singles. With this album, they were first granted distribution in the UK.

Casablanca Records
In 1982, Cameo released their first album with Casablanca Records, titled Alligator Woman, which debuted at number 6 and 23 on the US Top R&B/Hip-Hop Albums and Billboard 200. The album featured the singles “Flirt”, “Secrets of Time” and “Alligator Woman”, all co-written by Jenkins.

In 1983, Cameo started their own label, Atlanta Artists, a subsidiary to Casablanca Records, and maintained distribution through Polygram Records. They released their ninth studio album, Style, which was co-written by Jenkins, and debuted at number 14 and 53 on the US Top R&B/Hip-Hop Albums and Billboard 200.

In 1984, Cameo released She's Strange, which debuted at number 1 and 27 on the US Top R&B/Hip-Hop Albums and Billboard 200. The self-titled single, “She’s Strange” was co-written by Jenkins and debuted at number 1 and 47 on the Billboard Black Singles and Billboard Hot 100 and also at number 37 on the Top UK Singles. "She's Strange" has been sampled by Tupac Shakur, Nate Dogg, Snoop Dogg, Jermaine Dupri, Usher, and Da Brat.   The album's second single, “Talkin’ Out the Side of Your Neck” was also co-written by Jenkins.

In 1985, Cameo released their eleventh studio album, Single Life, under Atlanta Artists and it debuted at number 2 and 62 on the US Top R&B/Hip-Hop Albums and Billboard 200. The single “Single Life” was co-written by Jenkins and debuted at number 22 on the Top UK Singles.

In 1986, Cameo released Word Up!; the multi-platinum album included the group's two biggest hit singles “Word Up” and “Candy”, which have been sampled or recorded by, among others, Korn, Mariah Carey and Will Smith.  Candy has been sampled 24 times by Will Smith, Mariah Carey, Tupac Shaker, Snoop Dogg, Nate Dogg and young artists Rich Homie Quan and Jacquees, and most recently, by Beyonce on her hit song, “Before I Let Go”.   “Word Up” has been covered 12 times, most notably by rock band Korn, and sampled more than 16 times.

Atlanta Artists

The group was trimmed down to the core trio of Blackmon, Jenkins and Leftenant, and they collaborated with session players whenever necessary. Their follow up album, Machismo, was released by Atlanta Artists in 1988 and peaked at number 7 and 56 on the US Top R&B/Hip-Hop Albums and Billboard 200. The album included the hits "You Make Me Work" and "Skin I'm In", both co-written by Jenkins.

2001–2019 Present day

In 2019, Jenkins released the single, “Naturally”, produced by Kyle West and Albert Brown. Also in 2019, “Candy”, was used in the season finale of Lee Daniels' TV drama based on the career of a female Pop trio, Star.

References

External links
https://tomijenkins.bandcamp.com/

American funk musicians
American rhythm and blues musicians
American soul musicians
Casablanca Records artists
Living people
Year of birth missing (living people)